Gustavus Warfield Dorsey (April 20, 1839 – September 6, 1911) was a cavalry commander during the American Civil War for the Confederacy. When famed cavalry commander Jeb Stuart was shot at the Battle of Yellow Tavern and mortally wounded, he fell into Dorsey's arms.

Early years
G. W. Dorsey was born to Samuel Owings Dorsey and Mary Riggs Griffith on April 20, 1839, a descendant of Edward Dorsey of colonial Maryland. He had three sisters and a brother. He married Maggie Owens.

Civil War
He enlisted on May 14, 1861 for Company K of the 1st Virginia Cavalry. He became a lieutenant colonel in May 1862, and after the death of his unit's commander Ridgely Brown, he commanded the regiment. He was wounded at Fredericksburg.

His unit was later transferred to 1st Maryland Cavalry in August, 1864. He was severely wounded at Fisher's Hill.

Yellow Tavern
Stuart rode up to give words of praise to Company K  and was shot in the stomach. Dorsey caught him and took him from his horse. Stuart told him: "Dorsey...save your men." Dorsey refused to leave him and brought Stuart to the rear.

References

External links

1839 births
1911 deaths
People from Maryland
Confederate States Army personnel
J. E. B. Stuart
Dorsey family of Maryland